The Jackie Boyz was an American multi-platinum singer-songwriter duo that consisted of two brothers, Carlos Battey and Steven Battey. The Jackie Boyz were acquired by Universal Music Publishing as songwriters in 2009.

History 

The Jackie Boyz were born and raised in Savannah, Georgia, where they began their music careers at the pier on River Street performing in their hometown. Their name comes from their mother Jackie, hence the name. Their father died in 2003, and their mother in 2004, spurring the boys to pursue a music career.

In 2011, the duo won their first Grammy at the 53rd Annual Grammy Awards for their contribution to the David Guetta One Love Club Mix of Madonna's “Revolver”.

Discography

Composition

References 

Sibling musical duos
American musical duos
Contemporary R&B duos
Living people
Year of birth missing (living people)